Massacre Canyon is a 1954 American Western film directed by Fred F. Sears and written by David Lang. The film stars Philip Carey, Audrey Totter, Douglas Kennedy, Jeff Donnell and Guinn "Big Boy" Williams. The film was released on May 1, 1954, by Columbia Pictures.

Plot

Cast          
Philip Carey as 2nd. Lieutenant Richard Arlington Faraday 
Audrey Totter as Flaxy
Douglas Kennedy as Sergeant James Francis Marlowe
Guinn "Big Boy" Williams as Private Archibald Peaceful Allen 
Ross Elliott as Private George W. Davis
James Flavin as Colonel Joseph Tarant
Bill Hale as Lt. Farnum
John Pickard as Lt. Ridgeford
Jeff Donnell as Cora
Charlita as Gita 
Ralph Dumke as Phineas J. 'Parson' Canfield
Mel Welles as Gonzáles
Chris Alcaide as Running Horse
Steven Ritch as Black Eagle

References

External links
 
 
 

1954 films
American Western (genre) films
1954 Western (genre) films
Columbia Pictures films
Films directed by Fred F. Sears
1950s English-language films
American black-and-white films
1950s American films